Junee is a medium-sized town in the Riverina region of New South Wales, Australia. The town's prosperity and mixed services economy is based on a combination of agriculture, rail transport, light industry and government services, and in particular correctional services. In 2015 Junee's urban population was 4,762.

Place name
One theory is that word Junee which originates from the Aboriginal word 'Junee' means "speak to me".
Another theory is that it is an Aboriginal word "Choo-nee" meaning "frog".

History
The Wiradjuri people are the traditional owners of the local area prior to European settlement. Leopold de Salis (1816-1898), pastoralist and later politician was one of the first squatters to open up the Riverina region to grazing. He established the  'Junee' pastoral run in 1845. Leopold held the licence for this run for a total of three years. Other run licencees followed until Thomas Hammond and Richard Gwynne bought the licence in 1857. The Junee run progressively reduced in area as selectors took up land but Hammond lived on it until his death in 1899, the remaining property having been named "Wyoming" in 1887. 
A post office opened in 1862 and a village called 'Junee' was gazetted in 1863 on the wool road to Sydney. That same year, Ben Hall and his bushranging gang raided the village.

In 1866 Junee's population was recorded as twelve but the discovery of reef and alluvial gold during the 1860s triggered a gold rush. The main sites- Junee Reefs (to the north), was mined on and off until after World War 1, as well as Wantiool and Eurongilly (to the east) until the 1880s.

By 1878 with the southward expansion of the Main South line in New South Wales, the main railway line between Sydney and Melbourne passed 8 kilometres east of the Village. Junee's Post Office was renamed Old Junee in 1885 (Junee railway station). Loftus was the original name of the locality being farm land and as the settlers moved in for the rail line it was renamed. Junee Railway Station Post Office opened on 6 July 1878, was renamed Junee Junction in 1881 and later still, Junee in 1893.

Rail and road
The Main South line between Sydney and Melbourne runs through Junee, as does the Olympic Highway, named for the route of the 1956 Summer Olympics Torch Relay.
The advent of rail transport in 1878 provided the impetus for an economic boom providing local agricultural producers with affordable direct access to markets in Sydney. In 1952 the largest wheat terminal in the Southern Hemisphere was constructed at Junee, adjacent to the South West Railway, providing both rail and road transport.

Rail transport makes an important contribution to the local economy with Regional Rail Logistics operating a containerised freight service that delivers various goods from Junee to Sydney, with interstate freight trains also passing through the town.

Local Government
On 1 January 1981, Junee Municipal Council amalgamated with the surrounding "Illabo Shire Council', creating Junee Shire Council.
Junee visitors and residents are served by NSW TrainLink XPT services on their way between Melbourne and Sydney. The local Council maintains an online tourism map including local places of interest.

Ray Warren statue 
On 6 August 2011, a bronze statue of rugby league commentator Ray Warren was erected at Dobbyn Park.

Climate
Junee experiences a subtropical climate (Köppen: Cfa, Trewartha: Cfak); with long, hot summers and cool winters; and experiences low precipitation year-round. The highest temperature recorded at Junee was 46.1 °C (115.0 °F) on 31 January 1968; the lowest recorded was -5.0 °C (23.0 °F) on 1 July 1971 and 6 August 1974 . The average annual rainfall is 527.7 millimetres (20.78 in).

Heritage listings
Junee has a number of heritage-listed sites, including:
 119 Lorne Street: Junee Post Office
 Main Southern railway: Junee railway station
 The Broadway: Athenium Theatre

Sport
Junee Football Club (Australian Rules Football) was established in 1911 and played in the South West District Football Association against Coolamon, Ganmain and Old Junee.

Population
According to the 2016 census of Population, there were 4,762 people in Junee.
 Aboriginal and Torres Strait Islander people made up 9.4% of the population. 
 81.5% of people were born in Australia and 70.9% of people spoke only English at home.

Notable people
 Laurie Daley, a professional rugby league footballer and New South Wales and Australian captain
 Bill Heffernan, a Senator for New South Wales, representing the Liberal Party
 Adam Commens, an Olympian hockey player
 Lawrence Legend, a motorcycle stuntman
 Ray Warren, sports commentator
 Bernie Fraser, former governor of the Reserve Bank of Australia

Communications

Junee is served by:
 Junee Southern Cross newspaper
 Radio 1RPH transmitter (99.5FM)

See also
 Jail Break Inn Fire

References

External links
 Junee Shire Council
 Junee -VisitNSW.com

Towns in the Riverina
Towns in New South Wales
Junee Shire
Junee, New South Wales